The third season of Let's Dance began on 9 April 2010. After three years of pause, Nazan Eckes returned as host, while Daniel Hartwich replaced Hape Kerkeling. Joachim Llambi, forming the head judge in fact, was the only remaining judge from the first two seasons. Former professional participant Isabel Edvardsson as well as Peter Kraus and Harald Glööckler joined.

Couples

Judges scores

Red numbers indicate the lowest score for each week.
Green numbers indicate the highest score for each week.
 indicates the couple eliminated that week.
 indicates the returning couple that finished in the bottom two.
 indicates the couple was eliminated but later returned to the competition.
 indicates the couple withdrew.
 indicates the couple that did not dance due to physical injury.
 indicates the winning couple.
 indicates the runner-up couple.

Average Chart

Couples' Highest and lowest scoring performances
According to the traditional 40-point scale.

Highest and lowest scoring performances 
The best and worst performances in each dance according to the judges' marks are as follows:

Weekly scores and songs

Week 1

Individual judges scores in charts below (given in parentheses) are listed in this order from left to right: Harald Glööckler, Peter Kraus, Isabel Edvardsson, Joachim Llambi.
Running order

Week 2

Individual judges scores in charts below (given in parentheses) are listed in this order from left to right: Harald Glööckler, Peter Kraus, Isabel Edvardsson, Joachim Llambi.
Running order

Week 3

Individual judges scores in charts below (given in parentheses) are listed in this order from left to right: Harald Glööckler, Peter Kraus, Isabel Edvardsson, Joachim Llambi.
Running order

Week 4

Individual judges scores in charts below (given in parentheses) are listed in this order from left to right: Harald Glööckler, Peter Kraus, Isabel Edvardsson, Joachim Llambi.
Running order

Week 5

Individual judges scores in charts below (given in parentheses) are listed in this order from left to right: Harald Glööckler, Peter Kraus, Isabel Edvardsson, Joachim Llambi.
Running order

Week 6

Individual judges scores in the chart below (given in parentheses) are listed in this order from left to right: Harald Glööckler, Peter Kraus, Isabel Edvardsson, Joachim Llambi.

Running order

Week 7

Individual judges scores in the chart below (given in parentheses) are listed in this order from left to right: Harald Gloockler, Peter Klaus, Isabel Edvardsson, Joachim Llambi.

Running order

Week 8

Individual judges scores in the chart below (given in parentheses) are listed in this order from left to right: Harald Gloockler, Peter Klaus, Isabel Edvardsson, Joachim Llambi.

Running order

Dance Chart

 Week 1: Salsa or Waltz
 Week 2: Jive or West Coast Swing
 Week 3: Rumba or Tango
 Week 4: Paso Doble or Quickstep
 Week 5: Samba & Group Rock'n'Roll
 Week 6: Two unlearned dances from Week 1 & 2
 Week 7: Two unlearned dances from Week 3 & 4 & Group Viennese Waltz
 Finals: Favourite Dance of the Season & Redemption Dance & Freestyle

External links
 Official website

Let's Dance (German TV series)
2010 German television seasons

de:Let’s Dance (Fernsehsendung)
pl:Let's Dance (Niemcy)